Phylesha Brown-Acton  (born February 1976) is a Niuean fakafifine LGBTQ+ rights activist. In 2019 she was appointed a Member of the New Zealand Order of Merit in recognition of her work with LGBTQ+ communities from Pacific countries.

Biography 
Brown-Acton was born in February 1976 in Niue. Her mother was from Niue and her father from Australia. She has seven siblings. Assigned male at birth, she knew from the age of four that she identified as a girl. At school, Brown-Acton was bullied by both students and teachers; at home her father was violent. Due to her complex home life, she was raised by her great-aunt - her grandfather's sister. When she was fifteen years old she socially transitioned and began to receive hormonal therapy in her 20s.

In her first career Brown-Acton was a dancer, performing internationally, including at the Venice Biennale. In 2006 she began work for the Pacific Peoples Project at the New Zealand AIDS Foundation as project coordinator; in 2009 she managed their International Development Programme. She has been outspoken about sexual violence that trans people face, including in 2007 when a group of ten men attempted to gang-rape her and the Tongan police reportedly victim-blamed her. She has also been vocal about the discrimination trans people face even obtaining services such as life insurance.

At the 2011 Asia-Pacific Outgames Human Rights Conference, Brown-Acton was the first person to introduce a Pacific specific acronym for western LGBTQ+ communities: MVPFAFF - Mahu, Vakasalewalewa, Palopa, Fa’afafine, Akava’ine, Fakafifine and Fakaleiti/leiti. Whilst the western umbrella term LGBTQ+ is often used try to include Pacific gender identities, Brown-Acton made it clear through her work that MVPFAFF identities are third genders with specific cultural distinctions between them. This acronym was later extended to include a plus sign: MVPFAFF+. This academic activism in conference spaces as it disrupts western constructs of Pacific gender identities. She has also spoken openly about the colonial roots of homophobia in many countries in the Pacific.

In 2014 she joined the board of Auckland Pride. The same year she worked at Pacific Islands Safety & Prevention Project Inc. as service support manager.

Brown-Acton is Executive Director of F’ine Pasifika, an LGBTQI+ rights organisation based in New Zealand which she founded in 2015. In 2018 she spoke at the Human Rights Defenders World Summit. She is on the Steering Committee of the Asia Pacific Transgender Network (APTN). Other roles have included as an advisor to the  Transgender Health Services Advisory Group, and a trustee of INA Maori. In 2020 she was selected as a member of OutRight International's Beijing+25 Fellowship program.

Honours 
In the 2019 Queen's Birthday Honours, Brown-Acton was appointed a Member of the New Zealand Order of Merit, for services to the Pacific and LGBTQI+ communities. She is the first Pacific trans woman to be recognised in this way.

Publications 

 Brown-Acton, P. (2020). Hands and feet: A reflection on Polynesian navigation—a Niue Fakafifine community practitioner perspective in Aotearoa-New Zealand. Te Kaharoa, 15(1).

References

External links 

 PrideNZ: Movement building for change
Pasifika Proud: Lockdown Messages from Pasefika Proud

Living people
1976 births
Niuean diaspora
Niuean women
Fakafifine
Transgender women
Niuean LGBT people
LGBT rights activists
New Zealand dancers
Members of the New Zealand Order of Merit